Sports Reference, LLC, is an American company which operates several sports-related websites, including Sports-Reference.com, Baseball-Reference.com for baseball, Basketball-Reference.com for basketball, Hockey-Reference.com for ice hockey, Pro-Football-Reference.com for American football, and FBref.com for association football (soccer). They also operate a subscription based service for statistics, called Stathead. Between 2008 and 2020, Sports Reference also provided pages for Olympic Games and its competitors.

Description
The site also includes sections on college football, college basketball and the Olympics. The sites attempt a comprehensive approach to sports data. For example, Baseball-Reference contains more than 100,000 box scores and Pro-Football-Reference contains data on every scoring play in the National Football League since .

The company, which is based in the Mount Airy neighborhood of Philadelphia, Pennsylvania, was founded as Sports Reference in 2004 and was incorporated as Sports Reference LLC in 2007.

Olympics 

Sports Reference added a site for Olympic Games statistics and history in July 2008. 

The company announced in December 2016 that the Olympics site was to be shut down in the near future due to a change in its data licensing agreement. Since that time, data for the 2016 Summer Olympics has been added, but the site was not updated for the 2018 Winter Olympics. Sports Reference closed its Olympic site on May 14, 2020.

The providers of the Olympic data, known as OlyMADmen, launched a new site called Olympedia in May 2020. According to Slate, editing of "Olympedia is restricted to about two dozen trusted academics and researchers who specialize in Olympic history."

References

External links
 

American sport websites
Sports records and statistics
Companies based in Philadelphia
Privately held companies based in Pennsylvania
American companies established in 2004
2004 establishments in Pennsylvania
Data companies